Friis formula or Friis's formula (sometimes Friis' formula), named after Danish-American electrical engineer Harald T. Friis, is either of two formulas used in telecommunications engineering to calculate the signal-to-noise ratio of a multistage amplifier. One relates to noise factor while the other relates to noise temperature.

The Friis formula for noise factor

Friis's formula is used to calculate the total noise factor of a cascade of stages, each with its own noise factor and power gain (assuming that the impedances are matched at each stage). The total noise factor can then be used to calculate the total noise figure.  The total noise factor is given as

Both magnitudes are expressed as ratios, not in decibels.

Consequences
An important consequence of this formula is that the overall noise figure of a radio receiver is primarily established by the noise figure of its first amplifying stage.  Subsequent stages have a diminishing effect on signal-to-noise ratio.  For this reason, the first stage amplifier in a receiver is often called the low-noise amplifier (LNA). The overall receiver noise "factor" is then

where  is the overall noise factor of the subsequent stages. According to the equation, the overall noise factor, is dominated by the noise factor of the LNA, if the gain is sufficiently high. The resultant Noise Figure expressed in dB is:

Derivation
For a derivation of Friis' formula for the case of three cascaded amplifiers consider the image below.

A source outputs a signal of power  and noise of power . The signal of power  gets amplified by all three amplifiers. The noise power at the output of the amplifier chain consists of four parts:
The amplified noise of the source
The output referred noise of the first amplifier  amplified by the second and third amplifier
The output referred noise of the second amplifier  amplified by the third amplifier
The output referred noise of the third amplifier 
Therefore the total noise power at the output of the amplifier chain equals

and the SNR at the output of the amplifier chain equals
.
The total noise factor may now be calculated as quotient of the input and output SNR:

Using the definitions of the noise factors of the amplifiers we get the final result:
.

General derivation for a cascade of  amplifiers:

The total noise figure is given as the relation of the signal-to-noise ratio at the cascade input  to the signal-to-noise ratio at the cascade output  as

.

It is amplified according to the amplifier's power gain . Additionally, the amplifier adds noise with power . For the entire cascade, one obtains the total output power 

The output signal power thus rewrites as

whereas the output noise power can be written as

Substituting these results into the total noise figure leads to

Now, using  as the noise figure of the individual -th amplifier, one obtains

The Friis formula for noise temperature

Friis's formula can be equivalently expressed in terms of noise temperature:

Published references

J.D. Kraus, Radio Astronomy, McGraw-Hill, 1966.

Online references

RF Cafe  Cascaded noise figure.
Microwave Encyclopedia   Cascade analysis.
Friis biography at IEEE 

Noise (electronics)
Equations